Roger Mannhard (born 5 January 1932) is a French former wrestler. He competed in the men's Greco-Roman featherweight at the 1960 Summer Olympics.

References

External links
 

1932 births
Living people
French male sport wrestlers
Olympic wrestlers of France
Wrestlers at the 1960 Summer Olympics
People from Sélestat
Sportspeople from Bas-Rhin
20th-century French people